La Norville is a commune in the Essonne department in Île-de-France in northern France.

Inhabitants of La Norville are known as Norvillois.

See also
Communes of the Essonne department

References

External links

Mayors of Essonne Association 
http://www.lanorville91.fr/

Communes of Essonne